Scotts is a modern dansband from Lidköping, Sweden. Established in 1992, Scotts competed at Dansbandskampen 2008, finishing up second behind Larz-Kristerz, starting to aim at their ambition becoming a full-time band. The band also competed at Melodifestivalen 2009, with the song "Jag tror på oss".

Members
Henrik Strömberg - Vocal, guitar
Roberto Mårdstam - bass
Claes Linder - keyboard
Per-Erik "Lillen" Tagesson - drums

Discography

Albums

Others
2009: Upp till dans

Singles

DVD
2010: På väg till Malung med Scotts

Svensktoppen songs
1999: "Cassandra"
2001: "Marias kärlek"
2001: "En blick, en dans, en kyss" (One Dance, One Rose, One Kiss)
2009: "Om igen" 
2009: "Underbar" 
2010: "Jag ångrar ingenting"

Missade svensktoppslistan
2002: "Leker med elden"
2009: "Jag tror på oss"

References

External links

 

Dansbands
1992 establishments in Sweden
Musical groups established in 1992
Melodifestivalen contestants of 2009